Nick Zentner is an American academic who works as a geology professor at Central Washington University in Ellensburg, Washington. Outside of his work with the university, he is known for his online videos covering the geology of the Northwestern United States and his series Nick on the Rocks.

Early life and education
Zentner was born on July 20, 1962 in the state of Wisconsin. He is the maternal grandson of inaugural Chicago Cardinals guard Clyde Zoia. Inspired during a 1983 trip to the Pacific Northwest on break from college, Zentner decided to study geology. Zentner earned his Bachelor of Science from the University of Wisconsin–Madison in 1986 and a Master of Science from Idaho State University in 1989.

Career
From 1989 to 1992 Zentner taught geology at the Miami University in Oxford, Ohio. After that, he took on his current position teaching geology at Central Washington University in Ellensburg, Washington.

He is known for his work in making online videos and public lectures covering the geology of the Northwestern United States. Starting in the mid-2000s, he gave lectures to the public about local geology topics, such as one on the Columbia River Basalt Group. These led to the production of a series of shorts he made called Two Minute Geology. He then produced the series Nick on the Rocks that is aired on KCTS-TV to the Seattle metropolitan area.

During the COVID-19 pandemic Zentner created live streaming lectures on various geology topics in a series called Nick From Home. In the Nick From Home series he focused on trying to provide an educational environment for children who might be out of school and to viewers from around the world.

Personal life
Zentner is a practicing Catholic and is married to a science teacher at Ellensburg High School. They have three sons.

Honors and awards
In 2015, he won the James Shea Award presented by the National Association of Geoscience Teachers for his work in presenting the geology of the Pacific Northwest to a broad audience. Two episodes of Nick on the Rocks, "Teanaway Tropics" and "Saddle Mountains Buried in Ash", were granted Northwest Emmy Awards by the National Academy of Television Arts and Sciences on June 5, 2021.

Publications
 Extension and Subsidence of the Eastern Snake River Plain, Idaho (2002).

References

External links
Nick on the Rocks at KTCS9
Nick Zentner Tedx Talk "Sharing Geology"
Nick Zentner

Living people
American geologists
20th-century American geologists
21st-century American geologists
Central Washington University faculty
University of Wisconsin–Madison alumni
Idaho State University alumni
Educational and science YouTubers
American Roman Catholics
People from Ellensburg, Washington
PBS people
1962 births